Silvertip Peak is a  mountain summit located in Park County, Wyoming, United States.

Description 
Silvertip Peak is part of the Absaroka Range, and is within the North Absaroka Wilderness, on land managed by Shoshone National Forest. The peak is situated approximately eight miles east of Yellowstone Lake, and two miles outside the boundary of Yellowstone National Park. The mountain's name was officially adopted in 1930 by the United States Board on Geographic Names.

Climate 

According to the Köppen climate classification system, Silvertip Peak has an alpine subarctic climate with long, cold, snowy winters, and cool to warm summers. Winter temperatures can drop below −10 °F with wind chill factors below −30 °F. Precipitation runoff from the mountain drains into Jones Creek and Crow Creek, which are tributaries of the North Fork Shoshone River.

See also
 List of mountain peaks of Wyoming

References

External links
 Weather forecast: Silvertip Peak

Mountains of Park County, Wyoming
Mountains of Wyoming
North American 3000 m summits
Shoshone National Forest